Erich Fiedler (15 March 1901 – 19 May 1981) was a German film actor. He was the German dubbing voice of Robert Morley.

Selected filmography
 The Escape to Nice (1932)
 Overnight Sensation (1932)
 Marion, That's Not Nice (1933)
 The Gentleman from Maxim's (1933)
 The Page from the Dalmasse Hotel (1933)
 The Two Seals (1934)
 Black Fighter Johanna (1934)
 Love Conquers All (1934)
 The Flower Girl from the Grand Hotel (1934)
 The Sporck Battalion (1934)
 My Life for Maria Isabella (1935)
 The Cossack and the Nightingale (1935)
The Green Domino (1935)
 Every Day Isn't Sunday (1935)
 I Was Jack Mortimer (1935)
 The Student of Prague (1935)
 Uncle Bräsig (1936)
 Escapade (1936)
 Paul and Pauline (1936)
 Susanne in the Bath (1936) 
 Game on Board (1936)
 Savoy Hotel 217 (1936)
 The Girl Irene (1936)
  (1936)
 Woman's Love—Woman's Suffering (1937)
 Der Etappenhase (1937)
 Land of Love (1937)
 Seven Slaps (1937)
 Not a Word About Love (1937)
 Little County Court (1938)
 Faded Melody (1938)
 The Deruga Case (1938)
 The Green Emperor (1939)
 Police Report (1939)
 Marriage in Small Doses (1939)
 Kora Terry (1940)
 My Daughter Doesn't Do That (1940)
 The Girl at the Reception (1940)
 Women Are Better Diplomats (1941)
 The Big Shadow (1942)
 I pagliacci (1943)
 Lache Bajazzo (1943)
 A Salzburg Comedy (1943)
 The Buchholz Family (1944)
 Marriage of Affection (1944)
 The Enchanted Day (1944)
 The Years Pass (1945)
 Tell the Truth (1946)
 Journey to Happiness (1948)
 Queen of the Night (1951)
 You Only Live Once (1952)
 Three Days of Fear (1952)
 The Divorcée (1953)
 Love Without Illusions (1955)
 Your Life Guards (1955)
 A Thousand Melodies (1956)
 Black Forest Melody (1956)
 The Mad Bomberg (1957)
 Munchhausen in Africa (1958)
 My Ninety Nine Brides (1958)
 The Juvenile Judge (1960)
 The Red Hand (1960)
 Robert and Bertram (1961)
 Jack and Jenny (1963)
 Eine Nacht in Venedig (1974)

Bibliography
 Kreimeier, Klaus. The UFA Story: A Story of Germany's Greatest Film Company 1918-1945. University of California Press, 1999.

External links

1901 births
1981 deaths
German male film actors
Male actors from Berlin
20th-century German male actors
German male voice actors